Ioan Andrei Ludușan (born 15 May 1996) is a Romanian professional footballer who plays as a forward. Ludușan played in his career for other Liga II clubs such as: CSM Râmnicu Vâlcea, Olimpia Satu Mare or Luceafărul Oradea, among others.

References

External links
 

1996 births
Living people
Sportspeople from Târgu Mureș
Romanian footballers
Association football forwards
Romania youth international footballers
Liga II players
FC Bihor Oradea players
SCM Râmnicu Vâlcea players
FC Olimpia Satu Mare players
ACS Viitorul Târgu Jiu players
SSU Politehnica Timișoara players